Fly Shoot Dori is a South Korean reality show program on KBS. The 1st League of the show used to be one of the Happy Sunday segment and was aired on KBS2.

In December 2019, it was announced that a new season was in the making. The new season aired on Tuesdays at 20:55 (KST) from January 7, 2020  to July 13, 2020 on KBS2.

Synopsis 
This show showcases young children with varying soccer skills. Through the show, they will be able to get to know each other and learn how to play soccer from the coaches.

Casts

1st League 

 Air Date

October 23, 2005 — July 30, 2006

 Director: Kim Jong-kook, Jun Jin
 Coach: Shin Jung-hwan, Kim Jong-min
 Manager: Lee Yeon-doo

 Player

 Jo Min-ho (조민호)
 Lee Hyun-jun (이현준) (Left the show in December 2005)
 Kim Tae-soo (김태수)
 Kim Tae-hoon (김태훈) (Appearance from Ep 3 onwards)
 Oh Ji-woo (오지우)
 Choi Seong-woo (최성우)
 Ji Seung-jun (지승준) - Captain and Goal Keeper
 Lee Seung-gwon (이승권)
 Jin Hyun-woo (진현우)

Shooter dream team 

 Air Date

July 2, 2006 — August 27, 2006

 Director: Yoo Sang-chul
 Coach: Kim Jong-min
 Manager: Shin Ji

 Player

 Jo Min-ho (조민호)
 Kim Tae-hoon (김태훈)
 Kim Tae-soo (김태수)
 Ju Hwi-min (주휘민)
 Jo Hyeong-ho (조형호)
 Im Won-jun (임원준)
 Seung Jun-soo (승준수)

2nd League 

 Air Date

September 10 — November 12, 2006

 Director : Yoo Sang-chul, Kim Tae-young
 Coach : Lee Jae-hoon
 Manager : Jeon Hye-sang

 Player

 Maeng Ho-seong (맹호성)
 Choi Seong-woo (최성우)
 Kim San (김산)
 Lee Seung-gwon (이승권)
 Kim Jeong-in (김정인)
 Choi Yoo-bin (최유빈)
 Lee Tae-seok (이태석)
 Choi Chan-uk (최찬욱)
 Park Geon (박건)

3rd League 

 Air Date

April 2 — October 29, 2007

 Director: Yoo Sang-chul
 Coach: Lee Jung
 Manager: Sim Min

 Player

 Lee Kang-in (이강인)
 Kim San (김산)
 Kim Seong-min (김성민)
 Shin Jae-yoo (신재유)
 Lee Dong-hwa (이동화)
 Kim Seung-jun (김승준)
 Seo Yo-sep (서요셉)
 Oh Woo-bin (오우빈)
 Lee Tae-seok (이태석)
 Kim Yoo-rim (김유림)

4th League 

 Air Date

March 8 — September, 2008

 Director: Yoo Sang-chul
 Coach: Kim Byung-man, Lee Jung
 Manager: Nam Bo-ra

 Player

 Oh Woo-bin (오우빈)
 Lee Tae-seok (이태석)
 Kim Dae-hyun (김대현)
 Kim Dong-geon (김동건)
 Kim San (김산)
 Go Ga-hyun (고가현)
 Kim Jin-won (김진원)
 Park Edward (박에드워드)
 Byeon Jun-seok (변준석)
 Kim Dong-seong (김동성)

5th League 

 Air Date

March 7 — September 12, 2009

 Director: Yoo Sang-chul
 Coach: Woo Seung-min
 Manager: Choi Seung-ah

 Player

 Jo Seong-bin (조성빈)
 Tia Johnson (티아존슨)
 Shin Hyung-kyun (신형균)
 Jo Yong-jin (조용진)
 Jeong Ui-hyun (정의현)
 Shin Jae-hoon (신재훈)
 Im Kyung-bin (임경빈)
 Kim Ji-hoon (김지훈)
 Park Min-kyu (박민규)
 Kim Ju-heon (김주헌)

6th League 

 Air Date

May 5 — July 21, 2014

 Director: Lee Jung
 Coach: Lee Chang-min
 Manager: Shin Soo-ji

 Player

 Lee Hyo-rin (이효린)
 Yang Seo-hyun (양서현)
 Kim Woo-jin (김우진)
 Kim Do-yoon (김도윤)
 Lee Ha-rang (이하랑)
 Kim Hae-mil (김해밀)
 David Yanson (데이빗얀슨)
 Jeong Tae-ha (정태하)
 Chun Kwan-hwi (천관희)
 Lee Si-on (이시온)

7th League — New Beginning 

 Air Date
January 7 — July 13, 2020

 Due to the outbreak of COVID-19, therefore from March 24 to May 5, 2020 and June 2, 2020, recording of the show had been temporarily suspended. Thus, for the time being, broadcasts in the coming weeks will be replaced by either special or rerun episodes of 'Fly Shoot Dori'.

 Casts
 Kim Jong-kook: Coach
 Yang Se-chan: Coach
 Lee Byung-jin: Castor
 Park Moon-sung: Commentator
 Lee Young-pyo: Director

 One Day Coach
 Kim So-hye (Ep 3–4)
 Alberto Mondi (Ep 6-9)

 One Day Director
 Lee Dong-gook (Ep 1–2, 4–6)
 Park Joo-ho (Ep 3–4)
 Kim Jae-hwan (Ep 6–7)
 Alberto Mondi (Ep 6–9)
 Ahn Jung-hwan (Ep 10–11)

 Players
Lee Jeong-won (이정원)
Jeon Ha-gyeom (전하겸)
Lee Woo-jong (이우종)
Byeon Ji-hoon (변지훈)
Lee Kyung-ju (이경주)
Kim Ji-won (김지원)
Park Seo-jin (박서진)

Rating 
 Ratings listed below are the individual corner ratings of Fly Shoot Dori. (Note: Individual corner ratings do not include commercial time, which regular ratings include.)

League 7

References

External links 
 Official website for 7th League 

South Korean reality television series
Korean Broadcasting System
South Korean television shows
2010s South Korean television series
Korean-language television shows
2005 South Korean television series debuts